The 2021–22 season was Reading's 151st year in existence and ninth consecutive season in the Championship, and covered the period from 1 July 2021 to 30 June 2022.

Season review

Pre-season
On 24 June 2021, the 2021–22 season EFL Championship fixture list was released, with Reading beginning their campaign away at Stoke City, and finishing the season away to Luton Town. Later on the same day, Reading were drawn at home to Swansea City in the First Round of the 2021–22 EFL Cup.

On 15 July, Readings proposed friendly against Aberdeen scheduled for Friday 16 July, was cancelled after two members of staff and one player returned positive COVID-19 tests.

On 16 July, the Madejski Stadium's naming rights were sold to title sponsors Select Car Leasing in a 10-year deal, with the stadium being renamed the 'Select Car Leasing Stadium'.

Transfers and contracts
On 25 May 2021, Reading announced that they had activated a clause in Thierry Nevers' contract, extending his contract until the summer of 2022 whilst also confirming he would be joining West Ham United for an undisclosed fee once the transfer window opens on 9 June 2021.

On 29 June, Reading announced that Tom McIntyre had signed a new contract with the club, until the summer of 2024.

On 2 July, Reading announced that they had signed new one-year contracts with youngsters, Femi Azeez and James Holden, whilst Lynford Sackey, Kelvin Ehibhatiomhan, Harvey Collins, Kian Leavy and Malachi Talent-Aryeetey all signed their first professional contracts with the club.

On 8 July, Reading confirmed that Michael Olise had left the club to sign for Crystal Palace for a record fee received by the club. On the same day, young goalkeeper Coniah Boyce-Clarke joined Bath City to train with and feature in the forthcoming pre-season games. On 13 July, Reading confirmed that Jökull Andrésson was currently training with Morecambe with permission to feature in two of their pre-season friendlies.

On 20 July, Under-23 goalkeeper James Holden, joined Maidenhead United on a season-long loan deal.

On 23 July, Jökull Andrésson signed a new three-year contract with the club, before moving to Morecambe on a season-long loan deal.

On 28 July, Nahum Melvin-Lambert returned to St Patrick's Athletic on loan for the second half of the 2021 League of Ireland Premier Division season.

August
On 12 August, Tom Dele-Bashiru joined Reading on a season-long loan deal from Watford. The following day, 13 August, Reading announced that Marc McNulty had returned to Dundee United on loan for the season.

On 19 August, Reading announced the signing of Junior Hoilett to a one-year contract. The following day, 20 August, Jeriel Dorsett joined Rochdale on a season-long loan deal. On the same day, young academy defender Jack Senga joined Maidenhead United on a work experience loan deal.

On 27 August, Reading announced the signing of Alen Halilović to a one-year contract after he'd left Birmingham City in the summer, and the season-long loan signing of Baba Rahman Chelsea.

On 30 August, Reading announced the signing of Scott Dann to a one-year contract, after he'd left Crystal Palace in the summer, whilst Danny Drinkwater join on a season-long loan from Chelsea later in the same day.

October
On 21 October, Reading announced that they had signed former Chelsea youth team player Rashawn Scott to their Under-23 team until the end of the season, whilst Academy Graduate Michael Stickland had committed to signing his first professional contract with the club come the completion of his scholarship in the summer.

November
On 1 November, manager Veljko Paunović tested positive for COVID-19, resulting in him isolating and assistant manager Marko Mitrović taking charger of the first team for their trip to Millwall on 2 November and Birmingham City on 6 November.

On 15 November, Reading announced the signing of Andy Carroll on a short-term contract until mid-January 2022.

On 17 November, Reading accepted a six-point penalty deduction from the EFL, dropping them from 16th to 19th, for breaking the EFL's Profit and Sustainability limits, with a further six-points suspended until the 2022–23 season.

On 19 November, Coniah Boyce-Clarke joined St Albans City on an initial one-month youth loan.

December
On 6 December, Reading were drawn away to Kidderminster Harriers in the Third Round of the 2021–22 FA Cup.

On 15 December, Reading's match against Luton Town scheduled for 18 December, was postponed due to positive COVID-19 cases within the First Team and Under-23 squads. Six days later, 21 December, Reading's away game at Peterborough United scheduled for 26 December, was also postponed due to COVID-19 within the First Team and Under-23 squads. On 27 December, Readings home match against Fulham was also cancelled due to the COVID-19 situation at the club.

On 29 December, Reading announced that their postponed trip to Peterborough United had been rescheduled for 15 February 2022. The following day, Reading confirmed their postponed match against Fulham would be played on 11 January 2022, and on 31 December, Reading confirmed that their postponed match against Luton Town had been rescheduled for 19 January 2022.

January
On 8 January, Reading suffered a shock 2–1 defeat to National League North side Kidderminster Harriers in the FA Cup.

On 10 January, Readings home match against Stoke City, scheduled for 15 February, was postponed due to Stoke City progressing to the Fourth Round of the FA Cup, and young goalkeepers Jökull Andrésson and James Holden were recalled from their loan spells with Morecambe and Maidenhead United.

On 15 January, Reading were defeat 2-1 by away at Middlesbrough, with Andy Carroll scoring the goal in what was he last appearance for the club, with his short-term contract ending the same day. Later the same day, Liam Moore was stripped of the Club Captaincy after stating his desire to leave the club.

On 17 January, Rafael Cabral left the club after his contract was terminated by mutual consent allowing him to return to Brazil.

On 24 January, Reading announced the signing of Karl Hein on loan from Arsenal until the end of the season. On 27 January, Reading announced that their postponed home fixture against Stoke City, originally scheduled for 15 February, had been rearranged for 5 April. On the same day, Reading's away trip to Peterborough United, scheduled for 15 February, had been pushed back 24hours after it was picked to be shown live on Sky Sports.

On 31 January, Transfer Deadline Day, George Pușcaș joined Pisa on loan for the remainder of the season, whilst Tom Ince joined Reading on loan for the remainder of the season from Stoke City, with Liam Moore going the opposite direction on loan for the same length.

February
On 15 February, Reading announced the signing of free agent Brandon Barker on a contract until the end of the season.

On 18 February, Harvey Collins joined Walton Casuals on a one-month youth loan deal.

Following Reading's 3-2 away victory over Preston North End, Veljko Paunović left his role as Manager by mutual consent, with Paul Ince being placed in interim charge of the club alongside Academy Manager Michael Gilkes.

On 22 February, Alex Rae was appointed interim Assistant Manager.

March
On 4 March, Scott Dann extended his contract with the club until the summer of 2023.

On 9 March, Paul Ince confirmed that Karl Hein had returned to Arsenal after a finger injury had ruled him out for the remainder of the season. The following day, Reading confirmed Hein's season ending injury, and announced the signing of free agent Ørjan Nyland on a short-term contract until the end of the season.

On 11 March, Lucas João was announced as the EFL Championship player of the month for February.

On 18 March, Coniah Boyce-Clarke joined Welling United on loan for the remainder of the season.

On 24 March, Reading announced the singing of Terell Thomas on a short-term contract until the end of the season.
The following day Reading announced that Jack Senga and Kelvin Abrefa had signed their first professional contracts with the club, until the summer of 2024.

May
On 4 May, Reading hosted an end of season gala dinner, where Andy Yiadom was announced as the clubs Player of the Season.

On the final day of the season, whilst the first-team faced Luton Town at Kenilworth Road, Readings U23 team won the 2021–22 Berks & Bucks Senior Cup, defeating Ascot United with goals from Ajani Giscombe, Imari Samuels and a Nahum Melvin-Lambert brace.

On 16 May, Paul Ince was confirmed as Reading's permanent manager, with Mark Bowen also returning to the club as Head of Football Operations.

On 20 May, Reading confirmed that they had offered new contracts to Tom Holmes, Josh Laurent, Andy Rinomhota, Femi Azeez and Andy Yiadom, whilst also confirming the departure of loanees Danny Drinkwater, Tom Dele-Bashiru, Baba Rahman, Tom Ince and Karl Hein. Additionally the club confirmed that Terell Thomas, Brandon Barker, Ørjan Nyland, Felipe Araruna, Alen Halilović and Marc McNulty would leave the club upon the expiry of their contract at the end of June and the contract discussions where on going with Junior Hoilett, Michael Morrison and John Swift. Reading also offered new professional contracts to under-23 players Nelson Abbey, Jeriel Dorsett, Imari Samuels, Claudio Osorio, Kian Leavy, Rashawn Scott, Kelvin Ehibhatiomhan and Nahum Melvin-Lambert, and to under-18 players Mamadi Camara, Jahmari Clarke, Tyrell Ashcroft and Louie Holzman. Pro terms where also offered to Hamid Abdel Salam, Sam Paul, Matthew Rowley and Benjamin Purcell, with Ajani Giscombe, Harvey Maudner and David Nyarko also having their contracts extended for an additional year. The club also confirmed the departure of Ethan Bristow, James Holden, Lynford Sackey and Malachi Talent-Aryeetey while Jordan Addo-Antoine.

June
On 15 June, the EFL released the Retained List for each club, which confirmed contract renewals for Jahmari Clarke, Tyrell Ashcroft, Louie Holzman, Harvey Collins, Hamid Abdel-Salam, Sam Paul, Matt Rowley, Benjamin Purcell, Jeriel Dorsett and Kian Leavy.

On 17 June, Tom Holmes and Andy Yiadom both signed a new three-year contracts with Reading.

On 22 June, Reading confirmed that Michael Stickland, Louie Holzman, Kian Leavy and Jeriel Dorsett had all signed new contracts.

On 24 June, Reading announced that Mamadi Camará, Rashawn Scott, Nelson Abbey, Matt Rowley, Sam Paul, Benjamin Purcell and Claudio Osorio had all signed new contracts with the club for the 2022-23 season.

Transfers

In

Loans in

Out

 Nevers' move was announced on the above date, but was not active until 9 June 2021.

Loans out

Released

 Transfers were announced on the above date, but didn't come into effect until 1 July 2022 once their contracts expired on 30 June 2022.

Trial

Squad

Left club during season

Friendlies
In May Reading confirmed their first pre-season friendly, against West Ham United on 21 July, at the Madejski Stadium. Reading's second pre-season friendly was confirmed on 8 June, a behind-closed door meeting with Charlton Athletic at the Madejski Stadium on 24 July. On 21 June, Reading confirmed their first pre-season friendly would be a behind-closed-doors match against Lincoln City on 10 July at their Bearwood Park Training Ground. On 6 July, Reading confirmed that they will travel to Scotland, to face Aberdeen in a behind-closed doors friendly at their Cormack Park training ground on 16 July. On 15 July, Reading confirmed their last pre-season friendly would be a home match against Crystal Palace on 31 July, a week before the new Championship season kicks off.

At the end of the season, Reading hosted a charity match between their 2005–06 Championship winning team and their 2011–12 Championship winning team as part of their 150th anniversary celebrations.

Competitions

Overview

Championship

On 24 June, the 2021–22 season EFL Championship fixture list was released, with Reading beginning their campaign away at Stoke City, and finishing the season away to Luton Town.

League table

Results summary

Results by matchday

Results

EFL Cup

On 24 June, Reading were drawn at home to Swansea City in the First Round of the 2021–22 EFL Cup,

FA Cup

On 6 December, Reading were drawn away to Kidderminster Harriers in the Third Round of the 2021–22 FA Cup.

Squad statistics

Appearances and goals

|-
|colspan="14"|Players away on loan:

|-
|colspan="14"|Players who appeared for Reading but left during the season:

|}

Goal scorers

Clean sheets

Disciplinary record

Awards

Player of the Month

References

Match reports 

Reading
Reading F.C. seasons